Vendetta is a 1999 HBO original movie directed by Nicholas Meyer and starring Christopher Walken, Luke Askew, Clancy Brown, Alessandro Colla, Andrew Connolly, and Bruce Davison. Based on actual events, it depicts the assassination of David Hennessy and the consequent March 14, 1891 lynchings of eleven Italian Americans in New Orleans.

Premise
Nineteen Italian-Americans were accused of the murder of the police chief. After the acquittal of six and mistrial of three, ten of them were shot or hanged in the largest mass lynching of Americans of European descendants in U.S. history.

Cast

 Christopher Walken as James Houston
 Luke Askew as William Parkerson
 Clancy Brown as Chief Hennessy
 Alessandro Colla as Gaspare Marchesi
 Andrew Connolly as Sheriff Bill Villere
 Bruce Davison as Thomas Semmes
 Joaquim de Almeida as Joseph Macheca
 Andrea Di Stefano as Vincent Provenzano
 Edward Herrmann as D.A. Luzenberg
 Richard Libertini as Giovanni Provenzano
 George N. Martin as Judge Joshua G. Baker
 Pierrino Mascarino as Antonio Marchesi
 Daragh O'Malley as Dominic O'Malley
 Kenneth Welsh as Mayor Joseph Shakspeare
 Gerry Mendicino as Charles Matranga
 Frank Crudele as Angelo Bagnetto
 Vincent Marino as Pietro Monasterio
 Louis Di Bianco as Emmanuel Polizzi
 Peter Didiano as Bastian Incompara
 Giuseppe Tancredi as Umberto Scaffidi
 Megan McChesney as Megan O'Brien
 Stuart Stone as Tony Provenzano
 Nigel Shawn Williams as Samuel Foster
 Anna Mancini as Francesca Marchesi
 Tony Mark as Mayor's Assistant
 Conrad Dunn as Pasquale Corte
 Ian Downie as Priest
 Ron White as Robert Collins
 Jack Newman as Jacob Seligman
 Jack Jessop as William Yochum
 Wayne Robson as Frank Peeter
 Delores Etienne as Emma Thomas
 Joel Gordon as William
 Victor Ertmanis as John Duare
 Richard Blackburn as Warden Davis
 Holly Dennison as Miss O'Brian
 Herbert Johnson as Houston's Servant
 John Healy as Construction Foreman
 James Bearden as Governor Francis T. Nicholls

Production

Writing
The teleplay by Timothy Prager is based on Richard Gambino's book, Vendetta: The True Story of the Largest Lynching in U.S. History.

References

External links

 Time Warner press release 

1999 television films
1999 films
1999 crime drama films
American crime drama films
Crime films based on actual events
Films about immigration to the United States
Films directed by Nicholas Meyer
Films set in 1891
Films set in New Orleans
Films shot in Kingston, Ontario
Films shot in New Orleans
Films shot in Toronto
HBO Films films
Films produced by Gary Lucchesi
1990s English-language films
1990s American films